Orcesis unicolor is a species of beetle in the family Cerambycidae. It was described by Breuning in 1954. This species of the long-horned beetle family is found in East India, particularly West Bengal.

References
 

Apomecynini
Beetles described in 1954